Mohd Reithaudin Awang Emran (born 5 August 1978, in Lahad Datu) is a Malaysian professional football player from state of Sabah, last played at Sabah FA before retiring.

He previously played for Sabah (which he made his professional debut in 2000 by then coach Ken Shellito), Perlis, DPMM and Malacca. He also has joined Perak on loan from Sabah, along with two other Sabah players in August 2012 for the duration of Perak's 2012 Malaysia Cup campaign.

He was not retained in the Sabah squad for the 2013 Malaysia Premier League campaign. After a spell as a guest player for semi-professional club in the Malaysia FAM League Cebagoo in 2013, Reitahudin were selected back in the Sabah squad for 2014.

References

External links
 
 Reithauddin relishes role

Malaysian footballers
People from Sabah
1978 births
Malaysian expatriate sportspeople in Brunei
Expatriate footballers in Brunei
Living people
Sabah F.C. (Malaysia) players
Perlis FA players
Malacca FA players
Perak F.C. players
Cebagoo FC players
Malaysian expatriate footballers
Association football defenders